Anathema were an English rock band from Liverpool. The group was formed in 1990 by Vincent and Daniel Cavanagh, bassist Jamie Cavanagh, drummer/keyboardist John Douglas, and vocalist Darren White.

The band maintained an active concert schedule throughout their career. They first toured in 1992 with the American death metal band Cannibal Corpse; they since performed throughout Europe, the United States, Central America, Australia, New Zealand, India, and Turkey. In the latter stages of their career, the band performed at notable venues such as London's O2 Arena, Wembley Arena, and the London Palladium, as well as appearing on stage with Stephen Hawking at Starmus Festival 3.

Anathema released 11 studio albums, including Distant Satellites (2014), which included the song "Anathema", named the Anthem of the Year at the third annual Progressive Music Awards. Three years later The Optimist was named Album of the Year at the Progressive Music Awards.

History

1990-1995: Serenades  and The Silent Enigma
Anathema formed in 1990 as a doom metal band, initially going by the name Pagan Angel. In November of that year, the band recorded their first demo, entitled An Iliad of Woes. This demo caught the attention of several bands and labels from the English metal scene.

At the beginning of 1991, the band gained a lot of attention with the release of their second demo entitled All Faith Is Lost, resulting in a four-album deal with Peaceville Records. Their first release under the label was The Crestfallen EP in November 1992. They took the material from that album on the road, touring with Cannibal Corpse.

Serenades, Anathema's debut LP, attracted a lot of mainstream attention, propelling their "Sweet Tears" music video onto the MTV playlist. Anathema's first European tour was in 1994, and was closely followed by gigs at the Independent Rock Festival in Brazil.

In May 1995, vocalist Darren White parted with the band, eventually forming The Blood Divine. Rather than recruiting a new vocalist, the band decided that guitarist Vincent Cavanagh should assume White's role. This new formation debuted by touring with Cathedral in the United Kingdom, and released The Silent Enigma soon after. It also showed the band starting to take a direction akin to gothic metal.

1996–1999: Eternity, Alternative 4, and Judgement
The release of Eternity came in 1996, relying more on atmospheric sounds, and starting the transition to clean vocals; the album Judgement would later consolidate this style. A European tour followed the album's release.

The next member to leave the band was drummer John Douglas, who departed in the summer of 1997. He was replaced by Shaun Steels, formerly of Solstice, who would also later play drums for My Dying Bride.

Alternative 4 was released in 1998. During this time the band underwent many line-up changes. Bassist/keyboardist/songwriter Duncan Patterson quit due to musical differences and was replaced by Dave Pybus of Dreambreed, a band which Duncan had played bass for during a short period, and not long after this Martin Powell (who had played keyboards and violin for My Dying Bride previously) joined the band for live performances. Finally, founding drummer John Douglas returned to the drums in place of Steels.

In June 1999, the album Judgement was released, marking Anathema's complete shift from the doom metal genre, focusing instead on slower and more experimental songs. This new sound has been likened to artists such as Pink Floyd, Jeff Buckley, and to a lesser extent, Radiohead. Their songs continued to express a feeling of depression and, more often than not, desperation.

2000-2009: A Fine Day to Exit and A Natural Disaster

In 2000, Martin Powell switched positions with Cradle of Filth's keyboardist Les Smith, who came to be an integral member of Anathema.

Shortly before the release of A Fine Day to Exit, Dave Pybus announced his departure from the band and later joined Cradle of Filth. He was replaced by touring bassist George Roberts, and later by Jamie Cavanagh.

In March 2002, Daniel Cavanagh announced his departure from the band, joining Duncan Patterson's band Antimatter. However, he later rejoined Anathema in 2003 for the release of A Natural Disaster, and started their European tour. This accelerated the changes in Anathema's tone, towards the atmospheric and progressive, as exhibited in album tracks "Flying" and "Violence".

Upon the closing of their label Music for Nations after its purchase by Sony BMG, Anathema found itself without a record label, despite having completed an extensive tour of the UK with popular Finnish rock band HIM in April 2006. During their search for a new label, the band adopted a more 'DIY' approach to music release, embracing the internet and releasing songs via their own website, for which fans may donate a monetary sum of their own choice. Despite the obvious lack of label-based tour support, the band continued to play dates across Europe, and guitarist Danny Cavanagh also playing the odd low-key acoustic concert.

2010-2013: We're Here Because We're Here and Weather Systems

On 20 March 2010, Anathema announced on their website and Facebook page the release date of their next album. We're Here Because We're Here was released on 31 May 2010 on the Kscope label. John Douglas' sister Lee Douglas joined the band in the capacity of a vocalist during the recording of this album. She had previously performed on the two previous albums as a guest vocalist.

On 6 July 2011, it was announced on the band's official page that their album of re-interpretations, Falling Deeper, would be released on 5 September 2011. The album was a follow-up to Hindsight and contained new orchestral versions of songs from the past, as well as a version of "Everwake" featuring the vocals of Anneke van Giersbergen. On 12 September 2011, Les Smith's departure due to "creative and musical differences" was announced on the band's website.

On 16 April 2012, the band's ninth studio album, Weather Systems, was released via Kscope. The album entered the UK album charts at No. 50 and the German album charts at No. 19.

On 8 November 2012, Daniel Cavanagh announced on Anathema's official website that Daniel Cardoso was joining in a full-time permanent basis, as a key element of the band. Cardoso and John Douglas both switch positions of keyboardist and drummer respectively.

On 2 December 2012, Anathema announced their first concert in India. Anathema has performed at IIT Madras as part of the Saarang Rock Show on 12 January 2013.

The band's live album, named Universal, was released as a double vinyl album on 24 June 2013. The album is a recording of a special one-off gig at the ancient Roman theatre of Philippopolis in 2012, where the band were joined by the Plovdiv Philharmonic Orchestra. The set was released on Blu-ray, DVD and CD under the name Universal, with an alternate track order, on 17 September 2013.

The band performed on drummer Mike Portnoy's Progressive Nation at Sea tour aboard the Norwegian Cruise Line ship Pearl that sailed from the Port of Miami on 18 February 2014.

2014-2020: Distant Satellites, The Optimist, and indefinite hiatus
On 28 March 2014, the band announced their upcoming studio album would be called Distant Satellites. The album came out on 9 June 2014 on the Kscope label, and was produced by Christer-André Cederberg in Oslo, Norway. Several tracks were mixed by Steven Wilson (of Porcupine Tree). Different from previous albums is the use of more electronica on this album. The album was released in four different versions: CD, vinyl, media book, and a deluxe version. The band toured the album starting 22 May in Istanbul, Turkey, continuing throughout Europe and travelling to Australia for the first time to perform three dates during August 2014.

Following the success of their short Australian tour, an acoustic tour was announced for New Zealand and Australia in 2015. Daniel, Vincent and Lee performed these show without the other band members. Later that year, the band released an acoustic live album and video entitled A Sort of Homecoming, consisting in the record of a concert at the band's hometown Liverpool Cathedral.

Anathema went on their Resonance Tour through Europe in April 2015. These concerts served as live retrospective efforts, featuring songs throughout their catalog, including from their debut album Serenades. Former vocalist Darren "Daz" White and former bassist/keyboardist Duncan Patterson joined the band on stage for these concerts.

In 2017, the band released The Optimist, which won Album of the Year at the Progressive Music Awards.

At the end of August 2019, it was announced that Anathema would be leaving the Kscope record label and had signed a new deal with Mascot Label Group. Anathema planned to release their 12th studio album in 2020. However, Anathema announced an indefinite hiatus on 22 September 2020 due to hardship with the COVID-19 pandemic.

Daniel's solo album Cellar Door and post-Anathema side-project Weather Systems
Daniel Cavanagh has announced he is working on a solo album named Cellar Door, and has started a new musical project named Weather Systems. The project takes the name of Anathema's 2012 album, and, according to a post on the Anathema Facebook page, "the music will be a continuation of the previous band’s legacy."
In December 2021, it was posted on Anathema's Facebook page that John Douglas had joined the Weather Systems project.

Members

Final line-up
 Lee Douglas – lead vocals (2010–2020)
 Daniel Cavanagh – lead guitar (1990–2020)
 Vincent Cavanagh – rhythm guitar (1990–2020), lead vocals (1995–2020)
 Duncan Patterson – bass (1991–1998, 2018–2020)
 John Douglas – drums (1990–1997, 1998–2020), keyboards (2011–2020)
 Daniel Cardoso – drums, keyboards (2011–2020)

Former members
 Jamie Cavanagh – bass (1990–1991, 2002–2018) 
 Darren White – lead vocals (1990–1995)
 Shaun Steels – drums (1997–1998)
 Dave Pybus – bass (1998–2001)
 Les Smith – keyboards (2000–2011) 

Touring musicians
 Martin Powell – keyboards, violin (1998–2000)
 George Roberts – bass (2001)
 Charlie Cawood - bass (2020)

Timeline

Discography

Studio albums
 Serenades (1993)
 The Silent Enigma (1995)
 Eternity (1996)
 Alternative 4 (1998)
 Judgement (1999)
 A Fine Day to Exit (2001)
 A Natural Disaster (2003)
 We're Here Because We're Here (2010)
 Weather Systems (2012)
 Distant Satellites (2014)
 The Optimist (2017)

References

External links

Anathema official website
Kscope music
Reviews and interviews at Chronicles of Chaos

English death metal musical groups
English doom metal musical groups
English gothic metal musical groups
English alternative rock groups
English progressive rock groups
Musical groups from Liverpool
Musical groups established in 1990
Musical groups disestablished in 2020
Articles which contain graphical timelines
Music for Nations artists
1990 establishments in England
2020 disestablishments in England
Sibling musical groups